John Brittleton (5 May 1906 – 1982) was an English footballer who played in the Football League for Aston Villa. His father Tom was also a professional footballer who played for England.

Career

Aston Villa
On 7 November 1927, Brittleton signed for Aston Villa from Chester.

References

1906 births
1982 deaths
English footballers
Aston Villa F.C. players
English Football League players
People from Winsford
Association football defenders